Priocharax nanus is a minute species of fish native to the Rio Negro, Brazil.  The species, which has a skeleton of cartilage, is almost completely transparent.  It grows to a maximum length of 15.6 millimeters.

References

Notes

Further reading
 

Characidae
Fish of Brazil
Taxa named by Ralf Britz
Fish described in 2014